Shedding may refer to:

 Shedding or moulting of body parts
 Desquamation, pathologic or non-pathologic skin shedding
 Peeling of the skin
 Shedding game, a family of card games where the objective is to get rid of one's hand first
 Natural hair loss in cats and dogs
 Viral shedding which is the release of virus progeny following successful reproduction during a host-cell infection
 Vaccine shedding an anti-vaccination myth about the release of infective virus following vaccination
 Woodshedding, practicing a difficult passage repeatedly until it can be performed flawlessly.

See also
 Sheading a subdivision of the Isle of Man